Heritage Hills is a hamlet (and census-designated place) (CDP) located in the town of Somers in Westchester County, New York, United States. The population was 3,975 at the 2010 census.

Geography

Demographics

As of the census of 2000, there were 3,683 people, 2,119 households, and 1,146 families residing in the CDP. The population density was 1,591.0 per square mile (615.6/km2). There were 2,290 housing units at an average density of 989.2/sq mi (382.8/km2). The racial makeup of the CDP was 96.99% White, 0.87% African American, 0.03% Native American, 1.47% Asian, 0.08% from other races, and 0.57% from two or more races. Hispanic or Latino of any race were 1.09% of the population.

There were 2,119 households, out of which 5.1% had children under the age of 18 living with them, 49.6% were married couples living together, 3.6% had a female householder with no husband present, and 45.9% were non-families. 43.0% of all households were made up of individuals, and 30.0% had someone living alone who was 65 years of age or older. The average household size was 1.72 and the average family size was 2.25.

In the CDP, the population was spread out, with 5.3% under the age of 18, 1.3% from 18 to 24, 11.7% from 25 to 44, 27.1% from 45 to 64, and 54.7% who were 65 years of age or older. The median age was 67 years. For every 100 females, there were 69.0 males. For every 100 females age 18 and over, there were 67.9 males.

The median income for a household in the CDP was $63,450, and the median income for a family was $90,904. Males had a median income of $89,866 versus $48,598 for females. The per capita income for the CDP was $46,523. About 0.6% of families and 3.3% of the population were below the poverty line, including none of those under age 18 and 2.5% of those age 65 or over.

Originally, at least one member of each household had to be at least 40 years old, with no one under 18 allowed to live in the development.{Prospectus on file with NYS Attorney General; July 10, 1983 New York Times article}

References

Census-designated places in New York (state)
Hamlets in New York (state)
Census-designated places in Westchester County, New York
Hamlets in Westchester County, New York
Somers, New York